Susan Allison is an editor-in-chief and vice president at the Ace Books and Berkley Books  imprints, which are part of the Penguin Group (USA) publishing company.  In 1984 she published William Gibson’s first novel, Neuromancer, and Guy Gavriel Kay’s first novel, The Summer Tree.  Both of these authors are still edited by her, now for Penguin Random House. Her authors also include bestselling author  Laurell K. Hamilton and Lee Smith. She became editor-in-chief in 1982, and was made a vice-president in 1985. She was a guest of honor of the 1990 World Fantasy Convention.

She is credited on the National Advisory Board for Poetry for Students; Volume 23. She is described as being a head librarian for the Lewiston Highschool, as well as a standards committee chairperson for the Maine School Library Programs.

On May 13, 2015, she announced her retirement effective 1 July, after 33 years at the company and more than 40 years in publishing.

References

Science fiction editors
Living people
American speculative fiction publishers (people)
American speculative fiction editors
Year of birth missing (living people)